Arignota is a genus of moths of the family Xyloryctidae.

Species
 Arignota clavatrix (Diakonoff, 1954)
 Arignota decipiens Diakonoff, 1954
 Arignota stercorata (Lucas, 1894)

References

Xyloryctidae
Xyloryctidae genera